A wake is a social gathering associated with death, held before or after a funeral. Traditionally, a wake involves family and friends keeping watch over the body of the dead person, usually in the home of the deceased. Some wakes are held at a funeral home or another convenient location. The wake or the viewing of the body is a part of death rituals in many cultures. It allows one last interaction with the dead, providing a time for the living to express their thoughts and feelings with the deceased. It highlights the idea that the loss is borne by the whole community and is a way of honoring the deceased member. The emotional tone of a wake is sometimes seen as more positive than a funeral due to the socially supportive atmosphere and the focus on the life rather than the death of the deceased. 



Origin 
The term originally referred to a late-night prayer vigil but is now mostly used for the social interactions accompanying a funeral.  While the modern usage of the verb wake is "become or stay alert", a wake for the dead harks back to the vigil, "watch" or "guard" of earlier times. It is a misconception that people at a wake are waiting in case the deceased should "wake up".

The term wake was originally used to denote a prayer vigil, often an annual event held on the feast day of the saint to whom a parish church was dedicated. Over time the association with prayer has become less important, although not lost completely, and in many countries a wake is now mostly associated with the social interactions accompanying a funeral.

Ireland 

The wake is a key part of the death customs of Ireland; it is an important phase in the separation of the dead from the world of the living and transition to the world of the dead. Typically lasting one or two days, it is a continuous watch kept over the dead by family and friends, usually in their own home, before burial. Shane McCorristine writes that the original purposes of an Irish wake were to honour the dead, to celebrate their life, to ensure that death had really occurred, to guard the body from evil, and to placate their soul.

Shortly after death, the body is usually prepared and placed in a coffin at a funeral home, then brought to the dead person's home for the wake, which is now referred to as the 'wake house'. Historically, the body was usually washed, groomed and clothed in a white shroud at their own home by local wise women. Traditionally, windows of a wake house are left open to let the soul leave the room, mirrors are covered or turned around, clocks are stopped, and household pets are kept out for the duration of the wake. It is also customary for candles to be kept lit.

Relatives and friends are expected to visit to pay respects to the dead and to their family, who in turn provide hospitality. At intervals, a collective prayer might be said; for Catholics usually the Rosary. Traditionally there is food and drink, as well as storytelling, music, singing and dancing. Historically, wakes were important social gatherings for the young, who sometimes partook in rowdier amusements and courtship. Patricia Lysaght says the traditional revelry at wakes can be seen as a way of reasserting the life of the community in the face of death. However, when a death is particularly tragic, or that of a child, the wake is more private and mournful.

Historically, keening was performed at the wake by a group of women who sat around the body. It was a poetic lament for the dead, addressed directly to the dead person. A leading keening woman (bean chaointe) chanted verses and led a choral death wail, in which the other keeners joined while swaying rhythmically. Sometimes professional keeners were hired to fulfill this obligation to the dead. Lysaght writes, "This communal lamentation is often described as having a cathartic effect on family and community members present".

Both keening and the rowdier 'wake games' gradually died out in the late 19th century, due to condemnation from church authorities.

At the end of the wake, the coffin is carried out of the wake house by male family and friends.

Wales 
Historically, there was a custom in Wales to store the coffin in the home until the funeral.

Other modern wakes 

Wake customs similar to those of Ireland are still found in North-western Scotland and in the North of England.

With the change to the more recent practice of holding the wake at a funeral home rather than the home, the custom of providing refreshment to the mourners is often held immediately after the funeral at the house or another convenient location.

In parts of Britain and some other parts of the Commonwealth, where it is not customary to have a public viewing ceremony before the funeral, the term has recently come to mean a gathering held after the funeral.

See also 
 Shemira, the custom of "guarding" the body of the deceased in Judaism
 Nine nights
 Month's Mind
 Lying in state
 Memorial service (Orthodox)
 Viewing (funeral)

References

External links 

 
 

Death customs
Christian worship and liturgy
Prayer
Funeral-related industry
Irish culture